Enrique Landrón Otero (22 May 1878 – 30 March 1935) was born in Vega Baja, Puerto Rico, Spanish Empire. He was elected to the Puerto Rico House of Representatives on November 6, 1928, for the District No. 5 of Corozal, Puerto Rico. He was affiliated to the Union Party of Puerto Rico and the Puerto Rican Alliance Party. He chaired the Finance Committee of the House of Representatives and was Vice-Presidente of the House in 1930. He was instrumental in the creation of the Puerto Rico Bar Association. 

Enrique Landrón Otero was a civic and political leader in Arecibo and Corozal, having served as administrator of the Central Cambalache in Arecibo and owning a pineapple farm in Corozal. He was co-founder of the Farmers Association of Puerto Rico, serving as spokesman in Washington for the Puerto Rican farmers. Died on March 30, 1935. He was buried at the Corozal Municipal Cemetery in Corozal, Puerto Rico. At his burial, Don Antonio R. Barceló gave his eulogy.

References

External links 
 Incidencias Parlamentarias en Puerto Rico, por Nestor Rigual

1878 births
1935 deaths
Members of the House of Representatives of Puerto Rico
People from Vega Baja, Puerto Rico
Puerto Rican farmers